Usagi Yojimbo Book 28: Red Scorpion is the twenty-eighth graphic novel in the ongoing Usagi Yojimbo series created by cartoonist Stan Sakai. It was published by Dark Horse Comics in 2014, collecting stories previously published in Usagi Yojimbo (vol. 3) #132 – 138.

Red Scorpion was published in trade paperback and limited edition hardcover (limited to 350 signed and numbered copies).

Publication Details

Trade Paperback Edition 

Publication Date: July 2, 2014

Format: b&w, 184 pages; TP, 

Price: $17.99

Signed & Numbered Limited Hardcover Edition 

Publication Date: July 16, 2014

Format: b&w, 184 pages; Ltd. Ed. HC, 

Price: $59.99

Table of Contents 

 Introduction by George Takei
 Taiko
 Toad Oil
 The Return of the Lord of the Owls
 Those Who Tread on the Scorpion's Tail
 Story Notes
 Cover Gallery
 Author Bio

Foreign Language Editions

Usagi Yojimbo 28: Czerwony Skorpion 

Publisher: Egmont Polska Sp. z o.o.

Publication Date: Grudzień 2014

Language: Polish

Usagi Yojimbo Número 28: Escorpion Rojo 
 
Publisher: Planeta DeAgostini

Publication Date: Febrero 2015

Language: Spanish

Usagi Yojimbo